Weseham is a surname. Notable people with the surname include:

 Roger Weseham (died 1257), English medieval academic and bishop
 Roger de Weseham (Oxford), English medieval archdeacon and university chancellor